Heeley is a former cluster of villages. Which all now form a suburb in the south of the City of Sheffield, England. The village has existed at least since 1343, its name deriving from Heah Leah, High Lea then Hely, meaning a high, woodland clearing. Originally Heeley was divided into three: Upper Heeley (or Heeley Top) was around the intersection of  Myrtle Road and Heeley Green, Middle Heeley was on the Gleadless Road at Well Road, and Lower Heeley (or Heeley Bottom) was on the London Road around Artisan View. At the 2011 Census the village formed part of the Gleadless Valley ward of the City of Sheffield.

History

Heeley Methodist Church was built in 1826. In 1833 Heeley there were 47 householders living in Nether, Middle and Upper Heeley. Heeley Parish was formed in 1846 from part of St Mary's Parish on Bramall Lane. Heeley Parish Church (Christ Church, Heeley) was opened in August 1848 and the first vicar was Rev. Henry Denson Jones. The clock in the tower of Heeley church was added in 1901 to commemorate the long reign of Queen Victoria. In the yard are buried more than 3000 children, most of them in unmarked graves. In 1876 the population of Heeley reached 3860 inhabitants.

Many shops exist in Heeley and many remain open. Harry Ponsford and Arnold Laver were two successful merchants, the first starting a modest moving business using a handcart, the second selling timber. Ponsford opened a furniture shop on London Road and Arnold Laver opened several outlets in Heeley, Mosborough and Chesterfield.  The Heeley Mosque was also completed in 2007

Transport

The main road through Heeley is the A61 London Road South/Chesterfield Road, this dates from 1757 when it was built as a turnpike road from Sheffield to Chesterfield.
A toll bar was built on this road at Heeley over the Meers Brook on the boundary between Yorkshire and Derbyshire.
The Midland Main Line railway line between Chesterfield and Sheffield, constructed in 1870, also passes through Heeley, a station and carriage siding were built on the former site of Heeley Mill. The station had two island platforms serving 4 tracks; two were fast, the two others slow. Heeley station was the first stop from Sheffield station. The station closed in the 1960s and the line narrowed to two tracks. A siding called Heeley Sidings remains and stretches from Heeley Retail Park to Archer Road. Sheffield's old tramway stretched from Sheffield city centre to Woodseats and Heeley was at a time the terminus. The tramway depot still stands on Albert Road and although damaged in high winds in 2007, has recently undergone significant and sympathetic renovation.

 Heeley Festival, one of Sheffield’s oldest Community Festivals. It’s part of a programme of community events and celebrations co-ordinated by HDT throughout the year.
 Heeley Institute, The Institute is a Grade II listed building and former chapel on the corner of Hartley Street and Gleadless Road, in between the old Anns Grove School and Heeley Parish Church. It is one of the oldest buildings in the area and was the first place of worship in Heeley when it was built in 1826. It was restored in 2001 by Tom Heeley Development Trust and is now a community space.

Heeley City Farm
Heeley City Farm is a city farm project in the north west of Heeley near the railway line. The farm is participating in several green initiatives, with a Wind turbine, and Green roofs to some structures being part of this project. The site was originally cleared as part of a scheme to build a new dual carriageway route from the south into the centre, possibly the Heeley Bypass, and the cleared sites along Bramall Lane were part of this scrapped scheme, from the 1960s.

Anns Grove School
A new Infants school has been constructed as part of the scheme to modernise school facilities in Sheffield. The new school is situated next to the older Victorian school overlooking Heeley Bottom. The project which is claimed as one of the greenest schools built has features such as ground sourced heat pumps to reduce energy usage.

The first phase of the restoration of the original Anns Grove School was completed in 2013 by the Heeley Trust and the site, now known as Sum Studios, houses artists' and community studios. Further restoration of the site is planned.

References

External links
 
 Sources for the history of Heeley Produced by Sheffield City Council's Libraries and Archives

 
Suburbs of Sheffield